Bullfrog is a large aggressive frog, of any of a number of species

Bullfrog may also refer to:

Places
Bullfrog, Nevada, a ghost town
Bullfrog, Utah, a small community
Bullfrog Basin Airport, Utah
Bullfrog County, Nevada, a short-lived county in Nevada
Bullfrog Hills, a mountain range in Nevada
Bullfrog Marina, in Utah

Companies
Bullfrog Climax Group, a UK video game-development company later called Climax Group
Bullfrog International, spa manufacturer
Bullfrog Power, a renewable energy company in Canada
Bullfrog Productions, a UK computer game developer

Music
Green Bullfrog, a 1972 album produced by Derek Lawrence
Bullfrogs and Butterflies (album), a 1978 album produced by Mike Deasy and features Barry McGuire and Candle

Sports
Anaheim Bullfrogs, an inline hockey team
Green Bay Bullfrogs, a baseball team
Raleigh Bullfrogs, a former basketball team
Yuma Bullfrogs, a former minor league baseball team
Peter "Bullfrog" Moore (1932–2000), former chief executive of the Canterbury Bulldogs Rugby League

See also
Bullfrog Road Bridge, a historic bridge near Taneytown, Frederick County, Maryland, United States
Bullfrog Goldfield Railroad, a railroad that operated in Nevada 1905–1928; see List of Nevada railroads